Chathiram Bus Stand, Tiruchirappalli, old name Chinnaiya Pillai Chathiram also popularly known Chathiram perundu nilayam or Chathiram Bus Stand, is one of the bus termini of Trichy, other being the Central Bus Stand. The terminus is located in a land of  near Chintamani, adjacent to St. Joseph's College.

Overview 
This ‘D’graded terminus, taking its name from the nearby Chinnaiya Pillai Chathiram, became functional since 1979 and officially recognised in 2005. The terminus is managed by Department of Transport (Tamil Nadu), mostly operating TNSTC's transit buses and minibuses to northern, eastern and western parts of Tiruchirapalli district.

Redevelopment 
The buses operated from the current terminal has been shifted to nearby roads where designated points has been created for different routes with makeshift shelters as an intermediate measure for continued operations. The work was originally slated to be completed in eighteen months, but due to lockdown for COVID-19 its expected to be delayed further. As per the plan the new bus terminal to host the following features.
 30 bus bays
 Passenger waiting hall
 Cloak room
 Feeding room for lactating mothers
 Ticket counters
 Food court
 Retiring room for police and bus crew
 Underground parking lot to accommodate 350 two-wheelers
 33 commercial shops (17 on the ground floor and 16 on other floor)

Services 
The terminus also handles mofussil intercity bus services, express buses, highway buses and sleeper buses at scheduled hours as it serves as boarding point for north and west bound buses belonging SETC, Karnataka State Road Transport Corporation and private operators to destinations like Chennai, Hyderabad and Bangalore.

On the left side of the terminus services for Srirangam were operated, and on the western side for Karur, Erode, Thuraiyur and Coimbatore and for Cuddalore, Perambalur, Neyveli, Jayankondam, Ariyalur and Musiri on the northern side (near Ramba Theatre complex).

Connections 

In popular culture 
The terminus prominently featured in Tamil Film, Sathiram Perundhu Nilayam (2013).

See also 
 Transport in Tiruchirappalli
 Transport in Tamil Nadu

References

External links 

Bus stations in Tiruchirappalli
Transport infrastructure completed in 1979